The 1990 Michigan Attorney General election was held on November 6, 1990. Incumbent Democrat Frank J. Kelley defeated Republican nominee Clifford W. Taylor with 63.73% of the vote.

General election

Candidates
Major party candidates
Frank J. Kelley, Democratic
Clifford W. Taylor, Republican

Results

References

Attorney General
Michigan Attorney General elections
November 1990 events in the United States
Michigan